Chess Team is a series of 20 military science-fiction fantasy novels written by American author Jeremy Robinson, featuring the ex-Delta Force operator Jack Sigler.

Premise
Formed under special order from the President of the United States (Thomas Duncan), the Chess Team faces off against the world's most dangerous threats. Jack Sigler, callsign King, leads a team of operators hand-picked from the best of the best from within the United States Special Forces. Tasked with anti-terrorism missions that take them around the world against any threat, ancient, modern and, at times, inhuman. America's most elite soldiers are about to uncover one of history's deadliest secrets.

Characters

Chess Team members

The core Chess Team consist of King, Queen, Rook, Bishop, Knight and their handler Deep Blue. Occasionally team members are added to operations and are given the designation Pawn with a number moniker (Pawn 1, Pawn 2, etc.)

Main series

The main series consists of eight novels, starting with Pulse and ending with Empire, and an origins title, Prime.

Prime (origins novel)
Prime is an origins novel published between Threshold and Ragnarok. It is now considered Book 0 in the series.

Pulse
When George Pierce finds the decapitated remains of the mythical Lernaean Hydra in a tomb beneath the Nazca plains surrounded by Greek texts he calls on Jack Sigler for help. Shortly after Jacks arrival a Gen-Y security team arrive from Manifold Genetics, killing archaeologist Dr McCabe and taking the remains.

Richard Ridley and Manifold have plans for the Hydra: a serum capable of regenerating tissue with horrific consequences.

Pulse is the Chess Team's first adventure.

Instinct

The second book in the series sees the Chess Team operating in the jungles of Vietnam with Dr Sara Fogg (Callsign: Pawn) of the Centers for Disease Control and Prevention (CDC). While being pursued by the Vietnamese People's Liberation Army Death Volunteers they must uncover the mystery of the Nguoi Rung.

Acting on information from George Pierce, King and Dr Fogg travel to Siletz in Oregon and find it completely destroyed but for an eleven-year-old girl, Fiona Lane, the only survivor left behind by the legendary Hercules.

Deep Blue's true identity is revealed to the team.

Threshold

Since the events of Instinct, King must raise Fiona Lane, the sole survivor of an attack in the Siletz reservation. When King receives a call that his mother has died, he goes to attend her funeral. After meeting his father for the seemingly first time and discovering that his mother had faked her death, King learns the truth about his parents’ past. While the rest of Chess Team is sent on a mission, their base, Fort Bragg is attacked by a myserious force and Fiona is kidnapped. Richard Ridley has returned, seeking to eliminate the last of the world's known speakers of ancient languages, including Fiona. Teaming up with Alexander Diotrephes, the mythical Hercules, Chess Team races to stop Ridley from harnessing the Mother Tongue and destroying mankind. Meanwhile, Tom Duncan makes plans to exit his presidency and devout his time to his role as Deep Blue.

The novel explores the concept of the universal language.

Ragnarok

Since the events of Threshold, the Chess Team, spread across the globe and struggling to reunite, must stop an otherworldly foe that is destroying portions of the earth.

The Norse wolf deity, Fenrir, appears as the mastermind behind these events.

King learns of the existence of Asya, a sister he never knew he had.

Omega

King and Asya, race to rescue their parents from Alexander Diotrephes, under the impression that they have been kidnapped. Discovering their parents alive, well and unharmed, King learns a startling truth about his family. Alexander and King are transported back in time to 799 B.C. Chess Team is approached by three clones of Richard Ridley to rescue the real Ridley, who still lives and is being held captive by Alexander. Forming a tenuous alliance, Chess Team and the clones travel to Carthage and rescue their nemesis, only to be met with immediate betrayal. Chess Team faces a challenge like never before as the final battle with Richard Ridley begins. Meanwhile, King helps Alexander in a quest to save his wife, Acca, from an unfortunate demise, and must later travel through history to return to the present.

Savage

Joseph Mulamba, president of the Democratic Republic of the Congo, has been kidnapped while attempting to find the missing pages of Henry Morton Stanley's diary. Wanting to make Africa a better place for all, Mulamba believes whatever Stanely discovered in his expeditions, which are detailed in his diary, holds the key to this. While searching for Mulamba, the Chess Team faces the rebel army, the African military, and a deadly mercenary named Monique Favreau, the Red Queen.

This is the final Chess Team novel to feature Erik Somers. Asya takes his place as ‘Bishop’.

Cannibal
While on mission to capture the leader of the El Sol drug cartel, Chess Team is thrown into a challenge unlike anything they have ever faced. Senator Lance Marrs joins forces with the cartel's leader, Hector Beltran, to take down Chess Team and unmask their identites. Meanwhile, King's fiancée, CDC disease detective Sara Fogg, must discover the origins of a disease that dates back to the Lost Colony of Roanoke, the death of its settlers and the modern threat whose power is about to spread across the globe. Tom Duncan makes the decision to surrender himself to ensure Chess Team's freedom at the cost of his own.

Empire

Following the events of Cannibal, Chess Team are now wanted and on the run. While searching for Tom Duncan, whom they have not seen or heard from for several months, they are sent to Russia to prevent a potential world war. At the same time, King, Asya and their parents search for evidence that Julie Sigler, King’s sister long thought to have been dead, is still alive and working for their enemies. The team uncovers a plot establish a global empire while battling sub-zero temperatures, monstrosities born from Cold War experiments and an ancient, yet powerful enemy.

Kingdom

Novellas

Chesspocalypse

The Chesspocalypse series of novellas occurs between the events of Threshold and Ragnarok while the members of Chess Team are scattered around the world.

Callsign: King
The Elephant Graveyard has been discovered, and with it a deadly secret. King and Sara Fogg are called in to investigate the mysterious disappearance of scientists within the area, but begin to suspect there’s more to the event than meets the eye. Surviving an assassination attempt, King must protect geneticist Felice Carter, who holds the secret to the origins of modern man, from high-tech mercenary forces born of the remnants of Manifold Genetics, and contends with a mysterious enemy known as “Brainstorm”.

Callsign: Queen
While searching for Rook, Zelda Baker, callsign Queen, is redirected to Pripyat, Ukraine to investigate rumors that a splinter cell of Manifold Genetics is conducting a secret project within the area. While fending off Gen Y security soldiers and werewolf creatures dubbed “Oborots”, Queen ventures underground, beneath the ruins of Pripyat's amusement park and locates the hidden Manifold facility, led by Richard Ridley's estranged brother, Darius.

Callsign: Rook
Following a mission that claims the lives of his crew, Stan Tremblay, callsign: Rook, flees Sibera and finds seclusion in the seemingly tranquil town of Fenris Kystby, Norway. Upon arrival, he finds that not all is what it seems; the residents do not trust outsiders, a pack of wolves wander the tundra, a mysterious creature has been terrorizing the town, and the locals refuse to discuss the town's past. Despite the setbacks, Rook is determined to stop the creature murdering the townspeople, and soon uncovers the town's sinister past, dating back to World War II.

Callsign: King, Underworld
In Arizona, King and George Pierce investigate an attack by an unknown creature. They soon discover something far more sinister is at hand, as they are pursued by the mythical Mogollon Monsters, a legendary hitman and stumble upon an experiment that can put the whole world at risk. And at the center of it all is an old enemy: Brainstorm.

Callsign: Bishop
Erik Somers, callsign Bishop, is sent to Iran to combat a group of terrorists that have acquired a weaponized variant of the lethal compound, Ergot-B, and discovers that Dawoud Abbasi, the terrorist leader intending to unleash Ergot-B upon the world, is his biological father. Bishop, along with a Delta operative known as Callsign: Joker, race against time to stop Dawoud's plans, while Bishop also seeks answers about his past.

Callsign: Knight
Shin Dae-Jung, callsign: Knight, is called from his vacation in Thailand to a mission in Shenhuang, a ghost city in China, to investigate the mysterious disappearance of a Delta squad. Upon arrival, the Osprey carrying him is hit by an EMP blast, forcing them into a crash landing. As Knight scours the abandoned town for signs of life, he encounters two children, who warn him of a monster prowling the city. When the wounded Osprey pilot is killed, Knight encounters the culprit: a humanoid monstrosity with regenerative abilities and an appearance reminiscent of the Lernaean Hydra, a creature Knight faced once before. Teaming up with SAS soldiers and Anna Beck, a former member of Manifold Genetics's Gen-Y security force, Knight must defend against a foe who will follow its objective of eliminating its foes to the end, and must uncover a conspiracy behind an illegal experimentation program.

Callsign: Deep Blue
Thomas Duncan, callsign: Deep Blue and his security force attempt to convert Manifold Genetics's former Alpha facility into Chess Team's secret headquarters, but must contend with invading Gen-Y soldiers, mutated salamanders, and a bomb that threatens to destroy the facility.

Callsign: King, Blackout
Graham Brown, the mastermind behind Brainstorm, has surfaced in Paris, giving King the opportunity to finally capture him. Having teamed up with cyber hacker, Bandar Pradesh, Brown, using newfound technology, intends to plunge the entire world into literal darkness. But in an unexpected turn of events, Pradesh, a cult member who seeks the destruction of the world, uses this technology to awaken a dormant micro black hole and, within it, a demonic entity. Facing threats on all sides, King, along with Sara Fogg, Fiona Lane and Alexander Diotrephes, must defeat this ancient enemy before dawn’s first light.

Continuum

The Continuum series of novella follows Jack Siglers progression through the pages of history as an immortal after being transported back in time during the events of Omega. For 2,814 years, King travels the globe, righting wrongs and generally attempting to stay out of the history books.

Guardian
Guardian is set during the time of the Babylonian Empire. The immortal Jack Sigler battles the ancient Tiamat for the life of a small boy.

Centurion
Centurion is set during the fall of Constantinople. Sigler, now a Roman Legionnaire, must battle an ancient curse.

Patriot
Patriot is set during the American Revolution. Sigler has assumed the mantle of the legendary pirate Lanme Wa. An expedition commissioned by George Washington himself raises him and seeks his help on a threat to the fledgling Americas.

Universe novels

Cerberus Group

The Cerberus Groups series follows the ongoing exploits of George Pierce and the Herculean Society.

Herculean
Following Alexander Diotrephes's departure from Earth, George Pierce has assumed the role as leader of the Herculean Society, an organization founded by Alexander to conceal ancient relics from humanity and prevent humanity from learning the dangerous truth behind the legends. While exploring the ancient Labyrinth, Pierce and his niece, Fiona Lane, discover a hoard of relics collected by Alexander, and are attacked by Cerberus, and shadowy organization who seeks the power of the Well of Monsters. Escaping unharmed, Pierce must recruit a team of experts including geneticist Felice Carter, mythology professor Augustina Gallo, high tech hacker Cintia Dourado and the previously believed to be dead Erik Somers, now known as Lazarus. Following in Alexander's footsteps, Pierce and his team use their knowledge of science, history and mythology in their race against time to stop Cerberus.

Guides and compendiums

Endgame

Jeremy Robinson and Kane Gilmour, the international bestselling duo behind Ragnarok and Omega, bring this comprehensive guidebook and a short story framing sequence for die-hard Chess Team fans wanting the next book in the series.

The book contains twenty original illustrations of the main characters by Christian Guldager, as well as a section of "eyewitness sketches" of creatures and events by Jeremy Robinson and fans of the series. The book is also wrapped in a short story about the team's handler, Deep Blue, which reveals the aftermath of the new novel 'Cannibal.

Related work

Chess Team make an appearance in several other novels either as direct appearances or referenced by name.

The Divide
This novel is set in a possible future timeline in the Chess Team universe.

Unity
This novel is set in a possible future timeline in the Chess Team universe.

Project Legion
This novel, the last in the Nemesis Saga, dances across the rift between parallel Earths bringing together many of Robinson's characters including members of Chess Team.

Dogs of War
Jack Sigler and the Chess Team are discussed in the ninth Joe Ledger series book Dogs of War by Jonathan Maberry.

Joe Ledger: Unstoppable

Jeremy Robinson contributed the short story "Prince of Peace" to the Joe Ledger anthology work Unstoppable by Jonathan Maberry, which sees Joe Ledger and Jack Sigler from Chess Team working together.

"SNAFU: Survival of the Fittest"

In this anthology short story, Chess Team battle giant mutant worms.

Film and television

As of 2015, the Chess Team novels, starting with Pulse'', are in development as a feature film series with Emmy Award-winning director Jabbar Raisani.

References

External links
 Official website

American science fiction novels